WCTV (channel 6) is a television station licensed to Thomasville, Georgia, United States, serving the Tallahassee, Florida market as an affiliate of CBS and MyNetworkTV. It is owned by Gray Television alongside Live Oak, Florida–licensed MeTV affiliate WFXU (channel 57). Both stations share studios on Halstead Boulevard in Tallahassee (along I-10), while WCTV's transmitter is located in unincorporated Thomas County, Georgia, southeast of Metcalf, along the Florida state line.

History

WCTV was Tallahassee and southwest Georgia's first television station. On October 13, 1954, the Tallahassee Democrat reports that plans of a new television station and the first television station in the Tallahassee market was introduced to viewers in North Florida and South Georgia. The station held the call letters WCTV beginning on January 25, 1955, the same time WCTV's studios were constructed in Thomasville. On August 29, 1955, the station began airing a test pattern as its test broadcast. The station first signed on the air on September 15, 1955, using channel 6, from studios on North Monroe Street in Tallahassee. WCTV was originally owned by John H. Phipps. Although it has always considered itself a Tallahassee station, it was licensed to Thomasville because the Federal Communications Commission (FCC) had allocated only one VHF channel to Tallahassee, channel 11.

Florida State University had managed to have the FCC reserve channel 11 for noncommercial use so it could put WFSU-TV on the air. UHF was not considered viable at the time. Until the 1964 FCC requirement that all new sets have all-channel capability, UHF stations were un-viewable without a converter, and even with one, the picture quality was marginal at best. Additionally, the FCC had just collapsed a large portion of southwest Georgia into the Tallahassee market, and UHF stations have never carried well across large areas.

Hoyt Wimpy, owner and founder of WPAX radio in Thomasville, persuaded the FCC to grant the Phipps family a license for channel 6 in Thomasville, the nearest city to Tallahassee that had a VHF allocation available. This could provide city-grade coverage of Tallahassee and north central Florida as well as southwestern Georgia. By this time, the FCC had changed its regulations to allow a station to operate its main studio outside its city of license. As a result, WCTV has been a Tallahassee station from the very beginning. However, it has always identified as serving "Thomasville/Tallahassee," and has operated a live studio/bureau in Thomasville for many years.

The station originally carried programming from all three networks, but was a primarily an NBC affiliate. After only a year on the air, it switched to CBS and has been affiliated with that network ever since. However, it carried a secondary ABC affiliation. It is still the only commercial VHF station in the market (the only other VHF stations are PBS members WFSU-TV, still on channel 11, and Georgia Public Broadcasting's WXGA-TV on channel 8). It was the only commercial station in the area until WECA-TV (now WTXL-TV) began operations in 1976 and took the ABC affiliation.

It was owned by the Phipps family until being sold to Gray Communications, now Gray Television, in 1996. Gray's purchase of WCTV forced the company to sell WALB, its flagship station in nearby Albany, because WALB's signal has city-grade quality in most of the Georgia side of the market (including Thomasville and Valdosta). WALB had doubled as the default NBC affiliate for Tallahassee for many years until WTWC signed on in April 1983, and WALB formerly carried ABC (until 1980) and DuMont (until 1955) programming as their secondary affiliations for the Tallahassee market. In 2004, Gray purchased WSWG in Valdosta, a UPN affiliate for the Albany market. The station dropped UPN in September of that year and is now a CBS affiliate as a semi-satellite of WCTV (see below). The acquisition created a strong combined signal with just under 50% overlap. WCTV had been the default CBS affiliate for Albany for many years.

In March 2006, WCTV moved from its longtime studios on County Road 12 in northern Leon County (approximately midway between Tallahassee and Thomasville) to new facilities on Halstead Boulevard in Tallahassee. The location formerly housed the now-defunct Florida's News Channel, a cable-only operation. On February 17, 2009, WCTV shut off its analog signal on channel 6, and became digital-exclusive on UHF channel 46.

On June 25, 2018, Gray Television announced that it would acquire the assets of Raycom Media, who had been owned ABC affiliate WTXL-TV since 2017. Because the FCC prohibits a direct duopoly between two of the top four stations in the same TV market, Gray opted to retain ownership of WCTV and sell WTXL to a third party. On August 20, 2018, Gray announced that they would sell both WTXL-TV and KXXV (along with semi-satellite KRHD-CD in Bryan) to the E.W. Scripps Company for $55 million. The deal was completed on January 2, 2019.

Former semi-satellite
From 2005 until 2019, WSWG operated as a semi-satellite of WCTV. As such, that station cleared all network programming as provided through its parent and simulcast most of WCTV's local newscasts (see below), but aired a separate offering of syndicated programming; there were also separate station identifications and commercial inserts. Although master control and most internal operations of WSWG were based within WCTV's facilities, that outlet does currently maintains offices on Pine Avenue in Albany, Georgia; it previously maintained a news bureau and advertising sales office on 2nd Avenue Southwest in Moultrie, Georgia.

Even though WSWG technically serves as the CBS affiliate for the Albany market, its over-the-air broadcasting radius reaches just short of Albany proper. This forces the station to rely on cable and satellite for most of its viewership. However, WCTV's more powerful digital signal reaches into Albany. Despite WSWG once being a semi-satellite of WCTV, it operates two digital subchannels (serving as the MyNetworkTV/MeTV and CW affiliates for the Albany market) that are programmed separately. With the sale of WSWG to Marquee Broadcasting (enabling Gray to re-acquire WALB as part of its buyout of Raycom Media), that arrangement was formally broken in April 2019 after a transitional period.

Programming

Syndicated programming
Syndicated programming on WCTV includes The Drew Barrymore Show, Wheel of Fortune, and Jeopardy!, among others. All three programs are distributed by CBS Media Ventures.

News operation
WCTV produces 31 hours per week of local news (five hours per day on weekdays; three hours per day Saturday and Sunday). Through a news-share agreement, WCTV also produces local newscasts for the area's Fox affiliate WTWC-DT2 (owned by the Sinclair Broadcast Group): the hour-long Fox 49 Morning News; and Fox 49 News at 10 - in both cases, the only local newscasts in their time periods. All news programming can be seen in high definition (down-converted to air in WTWC-DT2's 720p format) featuring a different graphics package and music theme than WCTV. The shows originate from this station's primary set at its studios but with unique graphics and branding.

WCTV has traditionally been the market's dominant station in the ratings due in part to the fact that it was the only commercial station in the area until WTXL's launch. WTWC has never been a contender in the market because its two attempts to air local newscasts were both unsuccessful. The second news department operated by that station (lasting from 1997 until 2000) was shuttered due to poor viewership and budget cuts.

During its time as a semi-satellite, WSWG simulcasted all local newscasts from WCTV, except for weeknights at 5 and 5:30. Although that station did not produce any separate southwestern-Georgia-specific segments during the simulcasted shows, WCTV formerly operated a news bureau in Valdosta. It also formerly maintained bureaus in Thomasville on North Broad Street, and in Moultrie at WSWG's sales office.

WCTV's former reporters assigned to southwest Georgia did not use any localized WSWG identification. WCTV did not provide news coverage of Albany despite WSWG being its CBS affiliate. However, there was severe weather coverage for all of the Albany market when conditions warranted, such as during a tornado warning. WCTV upgraded its news production to high definition level on August 3, 2009 and the simulcasts on WSWG were included in the switch.

Technical information
The stations' digital signals are multiplexed:

References

External links
WCTV
WCTV-DT2 MyNetworkTV & MeTV

Television channels and stations established in 1955
CTV
CBS network affiliates
Ion Television affiliates
Gray Television
1955 establishments in Georgia (U.S. state)
Thomas County, Georgia